Singularia mayaensis is a moth of the family Pterophoridae. It is found in Costa Rica.

The wingspan is 26 mm. The forewings are dark grey-brown and the markings are whitish. The hindwings and fringes are dark grey-brown. Adults are on wing in January, August and September at altitudes between 1,500 and 2,200 m.

Etymology
The species is named after the Maya people, living in the region.

References

Moths described in 2011
Pterophorini